New Manchester (formerly Fairview and Pughtown) is an unincorporated community in Hancock County, West Virginia, United States. It is located along West Virginia Route 8 northeast of New Cumberland near Tomlinson Run State Park.

New Manchester was originally called Manchester and was platted in 1810. The Old Court House was listed on the National Register of Historic Places in 1973 but has since been demolished.

References

External links 
Tomlinson Run State Park

Unincorporated communities in Hancock County, West Virginia
Former county seats in West Virginia
Unincorporated communities in West Virginia